() was an Arab author from Baghdad. This is the earliest known Arabic cookbook. It contains over 600 recipes, divided into 132 chapters.

The  is the oldest surviving Arabic cookbook, written by al-Warraq in the 10th century. It is compiled from the recipes of the 8th and 9th century courts of the Abbasid Caliphate in Baghdad. Some scholars speculate that al-Warraq may have prepared the manuscript on behalf of a patron, the Hamdanid prince Sayf al-Dawla, who sought to improve the cultural prestige of his own court in Aleppo as the court in Baghdad had started to decline.

Some recipes in the book, like  (date-sweetened porridge), come from the relatively simple cuisine of the Arabian peninsula, but the book also contains recipes for fancy stews with Persian names.

Several partial or full translations in European languages are available:
 Nawal Nasrallah, annotated translation
 Lilia Zaouali, selection of two dozen recipes
 Sabrina Favaro's Italian translation
 David Waines, selection of recipes

See also

 Muhammad bin Hasan al-Baghdadi, author of a 13th-century Arabic cookbook by the same name

References

Further reading 
 Kaj Öhrnberg and Sahban Mroueh, eds., Kitab al-tabikh Studia orientalia 60, Finnish Oriental Society, 1987. 
 Charles Perry, "Cooking with the Caliphs", Saudi Aramco World 57:4 (July/August 2006) full text

10th-century writers
Iraqi writers
Arab cuisine
Writers from Baghdad
Cookbook writers of the medieval Islamic world